Scott is a small unincorporated community in Van Buren Township, LaGrange County, Indiana.

History
Scott, originally called Van Buren, was platted in 1833. A post office called Scott opened in 1837, and remained in operation until it was discontinued in 1905.

Geography

References

Unincorporated communities in LaGrange County, Indiana
Unincorporated communities in Indiana